Lieutenant General Gerardus Johannes Berenschot (24 July 1887 – 13 October 1941) was Commander-in-Chief of the Koninklijk Nederlands Indisch Leger (Royal Netherlands East Indies Army; KNIL). An Indo – as Eurasians of Indonesian and Dutch descent – Berenschot was the son of a Dutch officer in the KNIL. 

G. J. Berenschot was the son of Gerrit Hendrik Berenschot and Florence Mildred Rappa. At the age of 15, he was sent to the Netherlands, where he attended cadet school at Alkmaar. He later entered the Royal Military College, from which he graduated first in his class. He was the only commander of Indonesian descent (Indo) in the Dutch East Indies.

Upon graduation, he returned to his native East Indies where he distinguished himself as a young subaltern serving in the KNIL during the bloody campaigns in Aceh. 

In 1934 he became the KNIL's Chief of the General Staff and, in July 1939, was promoted to Commander-in-Chief. 

Berenschot was regarded as a gifted officer with organisational skills and possibly the best Commander-in-Chief the KNIL ever had. Not only was he a skilled soldier, Berenschot also displayed an impressive understanding of politics and diplomacy. Following the fall of the Netherlands in 1940, Berenschot participated in conferences involving Allied leaders at Singapore, where he was well liked and well regarded by his British and US counterparts.

On 13 October 1941, the plane carrying Bereschot back from a conference with British Air Chief Marshal Robert Brooke-Popham crashed in the suburbs of Batavia. There were no survivors. By order of the colonial authorities, all flags on public buildings were hung at half-mast. Berenschot's remains were buried in the cemetery at Bandung.

Bereschot's post of Commander-in-Chief of the KNIL was given to Lieutenant General Hein ter Poorten, who had the difficult task of preparing the East Indies for the looming war with Japan.

Berenschot was married and with three children. His brother was Berend Willem Berenschot.

Awards and decorations
  Knight of the Order of the Netherlands Lion
  Commander of the Order of Orange-Nassau
  Expedition Cross with clasps "Atjeh 1906–1910" and "Atjeh 1911–1914" and "Honourable Mention"
  Medal for Long, Honest and Faithful Service

External links
 Short biography

1887 births
1941 deaths
People from Solok
Royal Netherlands East Indies Army generals
Royal Netherlands East Indies Army officers
Royal Netherlands East Indies Army personnel of World War II
Victims of aviation accidents or incidents in Indonesia
Indo people
Officers of the Order of Orange-Nassau
Knights of the Order of the Netherlands Lion
Victims of aviation accidents or incidents in 1941